VPV Purmersteijn is a football club from Purmerend, Netherlands. VPV Purmersteijn plays in the 2019–20 Sunday Hoofdklasse B.

References

External links
 Official site

Football clubs in the Netherlands
Football clubs in North Holland
Association football clubs established in 1907
1907 establishments in the Netherlands
Sport in Purmerend